Willi Münstermann (1903–1982) was a German entrepreneur. He did much towards the development of the sport of ice hockey in Germany, and was a founder and sponsor of the Krefeld Penguins, a top league ice hockey team, in 1936.

References

Businesspeople from Düsseldorf
1903 births
1982 deaths
20th-century German people
Ice hockey people in Germany